Excuse My French is an RDF language programme on the BBC where three celebrities with varying levels of French had one month to learn enough of the language to be able to carry out a task related to their area of expertise in French. They did this while staying in a villa in Provence. They were helped by three teachers (Thierry, Patricia and Christine) from the Institut Français. The series was screened on BBC Two on Tuesday evenings at 9pm in July and August 2006, and consisted of four episodes.

It featured Esther Rantzen, Marcus Brigstocke and Ron Atkinson. Rantzen had the best knowledge of French of the three celebrities, and at the end of the series her task was to interview a politician on a television show. Brigstocke had a basic knowledge of French to begin the show, but showed much improvement throughout the series, culminating in him performing a comedy sketch completely in French. Atkinson began the show with no knowledge of French (although he has a little knowledge of Spanish), and faced the steepest learning curve so that at the end of the month he was able to give a short analysis of a football match on French radio.

The show was more light entertainment than educational, and was often not taken seriously by the contestants, which led to a number of entertaining confrontations between the students and their tutors, especially Atkinson with his teacher Christine. However, at the end of the series, all three of the celebrities managed to perform their task successfully.

There was some criticism over the programme, in particular over the area that the students were in, as the Provençal have a strong regional accent, an experience akin to learning English in Newcastle. Plus, the attitude by some of the teachers was seen as being harsh and some of the tasks were seen as much too difficult, such as making deliveries to people but with something deliberately put wrong in their deliveries.

References

External links
 
 

2006 British television series debuts
2006 British television series endings
2000s British reality television series
2000s British television miniseries
BBC Television shows
English-language television shows
Television series by Banijay
Television shows set in France